Joseph Andrew Shalika (June 25, 1941 – September 18, 2010) was a mathematician working on automorphic forms and representation theory, who introduced the multiplicity-one theorem.  He was a member of the Institute for Advanced Study from 1965 to 1966.

References

External links

Professor Joseph Shalika (1941-2010)

20th-century American mathematicians
21st-century American mathematicians
1941 births
2010 deaths
Johns Hopkins University alumni